Verlinde is a surname. Notable people with the surname include:

Erik Verlinde (born 1962), Dutch theoretical physicist and string theorist. Brother of Herman
Herman Verlinde (born 1962), Dutch theoretical physicist and string theorist. Brother of Erik

See also
Verlinde algebra, associative algebra